Cheshmeh Sabz-e Pain (also Romanized as Cheshmeh Sabz-e Pā’īn; also known as Chashmeh-ye Sabz, Cheshmeh Sabz, Cheshmeh Sabz Gholi, and Cheshmeh-ye Sabz) is a village in Kuh Panj Rural District, in the Central District of Bardsir County, Kerman Province, Iran. At the 2006 census, its population was 118, in 23 families.

References 

Populated places in Bardsir County